Pošná is a municipality and village in Pelhřimov District in the Vysočina Region of the Czech Republic. It has about 300 inhabitants.

Administrative parts
Villages of Nesvačily, Proseč and Zahrádka are administrative parts of Pošná.

References

Villages in Pelhřimov District